Wierszyno  (German: Versin) is a village in the administrative district of Gmina Kołczygłowy, within Bytów County, Pomeranian Voivodeship, in northern Poland.

For details of the history of the region, see History of Pomerania.

The village has a population of 189.

Notable residents
Georg Ludwig von Puttkamer (1715-1759), general

References

Wierszyno